The 900/800 class railcars (or DEB sets) were Diesel Multiple Units built by the New South Wales Government Railways between November 1951 and November 1960.

Configuration
As introduced, the DEB sets were formed as a four-car with a power car at either end of two trailer cars. The set consisted a driving power car with luggage compartment and second class seating (HPF), a first class sitting car (TB), a second class sitting car with buffet (TFR) and a driving power car with second class seating (PF). Later configurations included a three-car set with two power cars and a composite (first and second class) seating and buffet (TCR). Trains consisting of two four-car sets or a four-car and a three-car set were operated on a number of services including the Canberra Monaro Express and the Northern Tablelands Express.

History
The bodyshells of the DEB sets were very similar to the two-car 600/700 class railcars that had entered service in 1949. However as they were intended for long distance services they were air-conditioned.

A troubled beginning
The first four-car set, powered by four 240 horsepower horizontal in-line six cylinder, four stroke Hercules DFXH-F diesel engines (2 per power car) coupled to Torcon hydraulic transmissions, entered service on the North Coast Daylight Express between Sydney and Grafton in November 1951. The engines and hydraulic transmissions proved unreliable and the set was withdrawn in May 1952 after less than six months in service. The construction of further vehicles was suspended until a satisfactory solution could be found.

Rebirth
The solution involved the fitting of two 250 horsepower General Motors Detroit Diesel 6/110 inclined in-line six cylinder, two stroke diesel engines coupled to Allison model TCLA 965 hydraulic transmissions to each power car. Production resumed and two 4-car sets entered service in May 1955 on the Canberra Monaro Express to Cooma. Other sets were deployed on the Far West Express from Dubbo to Bourke, Cobar and Coonamble in December 1957 and the Northern Tablelands Express in June 1959. Later cars were fitted with Allison RC3 transmissions.

The DEB sets were able to provide flexible main line services with a seven or eight car train operating from Sydney to a major junction station and then dividing into two trains to travel through to their destinations. The Canberra Monaro Express (8 cars) divided at Queanbeyan with separate portions for Canberra and Cooma while the Northern Tablelands Express (7 cars) divided at Werris Creek with one portion operating to either Glen Innes or Tenterfield and the other to Moree, and Walgett once a week for a short period.

Service changes
The Canberra Monaro Express was reduced to a single 4-car set in July 1973 following a fall in patronage. The repeated failures of the Tulloch railcars working the Riverina Express resulted in the now spare Canberra DEB set being assigned to Riverina workings in August 1973, allowing one Tulloch set to be withdrawn with a second set replacing the remaining Tulloch set following the cessation of the Far West Express in September 1975.

During the 1980s a program of retrofitting higher performance Cummins NTA-855-R4 engines with Japanese Niigata DAFRG 2001 lock-up torque converter transmissions to all units commenced. Part way through the rebuilding program, use of the Niigata transmission was dropped in favour of the Voith T211r model.

Redeployed
DEB sets were replaced by XPTs on the Riverina Express in June 1982 and the Northern Tablelands Express in June 1984. One set was transferred to operate on a Canberra service in August 1982 before that too went over to XPT operation (not the Canberra Monaro Express) in August 1983, with the set transferred to operate Illawarra line services from Sydney to Bomaderry from November 1983. DEB sets were also used to operate connecting services from Junee to Griffith and Werris Creek to Moree.

Budd railcars took over the Griffith service in February 1983. The Moree service was replaced by road transport in February 1986, but a DEB service was reinstated in November 1988, before again being withdrawn in February 1990.

In late 1984, a DEB set took over the operation of the Orange – Lithgow – Mudgee service from a 620/720 set until replaced by road transport in December 1985.

The Canberra Monaro Express to Cooma ceased operating in September 1988 due to the government not restoring the Chakola bridge over the Numeralla River north of Cooma.

CityRail
From April 1989 all were reallocated to CityRail to operate South Coast services to Bomaderry and Main Southern line services to Moss Vale and Goulburn.

Demise
The last were retired in February 1995 after being replaced by Endeavour railcars.

Several were saved for preservation. One set is under restoration by Lachlan Valley Railway, based in Cowra. Five DEB set carriages have been designated heritage items and remain in the ownership of Transport Asset Holding Entity and are currently in storage at Broadmeadow Locomotive Depot.

Status table

Configuration
The diesel engines were direct coupled to a torque converter, the output from the torque converter was then transferred to a Spicer model 8 final drive unit mounted on the inner axle of each bogie via a propeller shaft. The bogies were of cast steel construction & were constructed by AE Goodwin. Coil spring suspension was fitted to both the axleboxes & bolster and the axles were fitted with roller bearings. Each engine also drove 24 Volt DC & 120 Volt DC generators, as well as an air compressor for the air brakes. Engine cooling was by two vertically mounted radiators contained in the body in a small compartment separating the two main passenger compartments. The air was drawn in through louvres in the walls and exhausted through the roof by thermostatically controlled fans.

Each power car was fitted with a driver's compartment to enable the train to be controlled from either end. The driving controls were electric; brake controls were electro-pneumatic and enabled coupled multiple units to be controlled by one driver. A safety device in the form of a dead man's foot pedal was also fitted in the driver's cabin. A guard's compartment was located adjacent to the driver's compartment in the end of the power cars.

The underframe construction consisted of two steel, all-welded Pratt trusses, extending from bolster to bolster and in depth from waist rail to below floor level constitute the main strength members of the cars. A light gauge aluminium framework made of pressings, in a similar manner to aircraft construction, was built on to the truss. The whole being then sheathed with aluminium. The floors were made up of 16 gauge aluminium alloy sheet covering the whole of the underframe upon which timber floor bearers were bolted to support the  plywood flooring. Linoleum was laid over the plywood. The floor under the plywood, body sides, and the roof were insulated with kapok material. Longitudinal luggage racks extending the full length of the saloons were built into the body sides. These were fabricated from aluminium alloy. Interior partitions and doors were of 13/16" resin-bonded plywood. All side windows were double glazed, set in rubber channels, and fitted with silica gel crystals in containers, to prevent frosting of the windows.

All the passenger seats were originally similar to the ones installed in the locomotive hauled air-conditioned daylight expresses of the same era; the first-class seats could be rotated and reclined; the second-class seats were of the turn-over type. Originally smoking and non-smoking accommodation was available in both classes. With the banning of smoking in enclosed places the cars then become all non-smoking.

The cars followed the modern trend and were air-conditioned for passenger comfort. The condenser and conditioner units being located above the ceiling at the end of each car. The conditioned air was conveyed along ducts in the car ceilings and delivered through anemostats to the passenger saloons. The air conditioning compressor units were mounted on the underframe of the trailer cars and in the control cabinets situated in the non-driving end vestibule of the power cars.

The power cars had two different configurations, the 900 Class (PF 901–910) having full passenger seating with a capacity of 39 Second Class passengers, while the 950 Class (HPF 951–958) had a luggage compartment at one end with a capacity of 5 tons, the other end compartment had a seating capacity of 24 Second Class passengers. PF 906 was rebuilt as HPF 959 between 1982 and 1984.

The trailer cars had a number of different seating configurations, depending upon which of the services they were deployed. There were three First Class passenger cars (TB 801–803), three Second Class sitting cars with buffet with a seating capacity of 38 passengers (TFR 851–853), four First Class sitting cars with buffet with a seating capacity of 38 passengers (TBR 854–857), two composite sitting cars with buffet (TCR 861–862) and three composite sitting cars with a capacity of 24 First Class and 31 Second Class passengers (TC 751–753).

There were also three parcel trailers built with dual braking systems to enable them to work with normal Westinghouse braked passenger stock and with the rail car fleet. These were coded TP 351–353 and worked through from Sydney on the Western Mail to connect with the Far West Express at Dubbo and obviated the necessity of transhipping luggage and parcels between the mail and the rail car service. Power for lighting and air-conditioning was provided to the trailer from the adjoining power car.

Gallery

References

New South Wales Government Railways publicity pamphlet "The Canberra-Monaro Express" c1955

Further reading

Railcars of New South Wales